The 2000 Mexx Benelux Open  was a women's tennis tournament played on outdoor clay courts in Antwerp, Belgium that was part of the Tier IV category of the 2000 WTA Tour. It was the seventh edition of the tournament and was held from 15 May until 21 May 2000. First-seeded Amanda Coetzer won the singles title and the accompanying $22,000 first-prize money.

Finals

Singles

 Amanda Coetzer defeated  Cristina Torrens Valero, 4–6, 6–2, 6–3
 It was Coetzer's first singles title of the year and the 7th of her career.

Doubles

 Sabine Appelmans /  Kim Clijsters defeated  Jennifer Hopkins /  Petra Rampre, 6–1, 6–1

External links
 ITF tournament edition details
 Tournament draws

Antwerp
Belgian Open (tennis)
May 2000 sports events in Europe
2000 in Belgian women's sport
2000 in Belgian tennis